Anwar Ali is an Indian former professional footballer and current assistant coach of Delhi FC.

Career 
Initially he used to play as a right-back for his school, DAV Jalandhar and impressed the national team scouts in the 2002 sub-junior nationals. Anwar was part of the 2004 Punjab Santosh Trophy team that lost to Kerala in the final; the same year he joined Punjab Police.

JCT
Joga Singh, assistant coach of Punjab Police, recognized Anwar's potential to play as a central defender because of his height, strong physique and strength in the air. From then on Anwar would start playing as a central defender and in 2005, he realized his dream of signing for JCT. The 2006–07 season would turn out to be a very important season in Anwar's career as it was in this campaign that he really came into the limelight. He was adjudged as the most promising footballer of the 2006 Durand Cup, where JCT reached the final and narrowly lost to Dempo. In the National League (now I-League), Anwar was one of the best defenders and his performances played a crucial role in JCT's runner-up finish.

Dempo
Ali signed with Dempo for the 2009-10 I-League season and was a regular for his team, featuring 18 times during the league but left at the end of the season.

Mohun Bagan
Anwar signed with Mohun Bagan for the 2010-11 I-League season and before the 2011 Asian Cup. Anwar had an impressive season, featuring 25 times at the heart of the defense for the Mariners.

United Sikkim
Ali signed for United Sikkim of the I-League in 2012.
On 28 January, he scored with a superb scissors kick from an Ashish Chettri free kick against Pailan Arrows at Kalyani, West Bengal and gave the visitors the lead on the 74th minute, though substitute Tirthankar Sarkar equalized 6 minutes later to ensure level-pegging.

Mumbai FC
Anwar spent the 2013–14 I-League season with Mumbai, building a strong defensive partnership with promising youngster Sandesh Jhingan whom he knew from his time at United Sikkim, helping his side avoid relegation.

Delhi Dynamos
Anwar was snapped up by Indian Super League side Delhi Dynamos for the 2014 season. Anwar was a regular for his team and played  all of his teams' 14 league fixtures.

Mohun Bagan
Anwar signed with Mohun Bagan for the 2014-15 I-League

East Bengal
On 11 December 2016 it was announced that Ali had signed with East Bengal for their I-League campaign after his stint with Mumbai City in the Indian Super League is over. In April 2017, he suffered a heart attack after a practise session and was admitted to a hospital.

ATK
Ali signed for Indian Super League franchise ATK ahead of the 2017–18 season.

International 
Anwar continued to improve the following season and finally got a call up to the national team squad. His first tournament was the 2008 SAFF Cup but the AFC Challenge Cup could be considered as his major breakthrough tournament as it was in this competition that he established himself as a regular. Anwar formed a formidable partnership with Gouramangi Singh at the heart of the central defence as India conceded only three goals in five matches.

The tall defender has been a first team regular ever since, helping India to retain the Nehru Cup title in 2009 and also featuring regularly in the international friendlies of 2010.

He was also in the 23-member squad selected for the 2011 Asian Cup in Qatar.

Honours

India
 AFC Challenge Cup: 2008
 SAFF Championship runner-up: 2008
 Nehru Cup: 2009

References

External links
 THE AIFF
 

Living people
1984 births
Footballers from Punjab, India
Indian footballers
India international footballers
Footballers from Jalandhar
2011 AFC Asian Cup players
I-League players
Dempo SC players
Mohun Bagan AC players
JCT FC players
United Sikkim F.C. players
Mumbai FC players
East Bengal Club players
ATK (football club) players
Indian Super League players
Odisha FC players
Association football central defenders
Mumbai City FC players
RoundGlass Punjab FC players